The 2000 Iowa Hawkeyes football team represented the University of Iowa in the 2000 NCAA Division I-A football season. It was the second season for head coach Kirk Ferentz.

Schedule

Roster

Game summaries

Kansas State

Western Michigan

Iowa State

Nebraska

Despite being 42-point underdogs, Iowa marched for a touchdown on their opening possession to take a 7-0 lead. Later in the first half, the Hawkeyes closed within 14-13 after Nate Kaeding's second field goal. Nebraska stretched the margin with a long touchdown pass on the final play of the first half and two touchdowns in the final 1:27 of the game.

Indiana

Michigan State

The Hawkeyes snapped a 13-game losing streak in capturing Coach Ferentz's first Big Ten win.

Illinois

Ohio State

Wisconsin

Penn State

    
    
    
    
    
    
    
    
    
    
    

This was the first of five consecutive Hawkeye victories (and 8 of 9) in the series.

Northwestern

The Hawkeyes never trailed in knocking off the #12/#18 Wildcats. It was the first time in three years that Iowa had won consecutive games.

Minnesota

Awards and honors

Team players in the 2001 NFL Draft

References

Iowa Hawkeyes
Iowa Hawkeyes football seasons
Iowa Hawkeyes football